Kallakudi   is a small township in the Tiruchirapalli district of Tamil Nadu in India.  It is located at a distance of 40 km from Tiruchirapalli Junction. This is the place which turned the career of Karunanidhi, the former chief minister of Tamil Nadu.

Kallakudi is the hometown of Dalmia Cements. This region is rich in limestone deposits. Dalmia Cements was the largest cement plant in Asia at its completion.It has a settlement called Dalmiapuram.

Educational institutions like Vivekananda matriculation school and Dalmia higher secondary school serves the local population here. Students do their higher education mostly in Trichy. There is a Saint Xavier middle school started in 1914. this was the first school in this area for the poor students. 

Cities and towns in Tiruchirappalli district